7-Aminoactinomycin D (7-AAD) is a fluorescent chemical compound with a strong affinity for DNA.  It is used as a fluorescent marker for DNA in fluorescence microscopy and flow cytometry.  It intercalates in double-stranded DNA, with a high affinity for GC-rich regions, making it useful for chromosome banding studies.

Applications
With an absorption maximum at 546 nm, 7-AAD is efficiently excited using a 543 nm helium–neon laser; it can also be excited with somewhat lower efficiency using a 488 nm or 514 nm argon laser lines.  Its emission has a very large Stokes shift with a maximum in the deep red: 647 nm.  7-AAD is therefore compatible with most blue and green fluorophores – and even many red fluorophores – in multicolour applications.

7-AAD does not readily pass through intact cell membranes; if it is to be used as a stain for imaging DNA fluorescence, the cell membrane must be permeabilized or disrupted. This method can be used in combination with formaldehyde fixation of samples.

7-AAD is also used as a cell viability stain.  Cells with compromised membranes will stain with 7-AAD, while live cells with intact cell membranes will remain dark.

Actinomycin D 

The related compound actinomycin D is nonfluorescent, but binds DNA in the same way as 7-AAD.  Its absorbance changes when bound to DNA, and it can be used as a stain in conventional transmission microscopy.

References

Gallery

External links 
 Structure from Invitrogen
 MSDS

Fluorescent dyes
Cell imaging
Staining dyes
Cell biology
DNA intercalaters